Venturi may refer to:

Venturi (surname)

Technology
Venturi tube
Ejector venturi scrubber, a wet scrubber
Venturi effect, a fluid or air flow effect
Venturi mask, a medical device
Venturi meter, a device for measuring the flow rate of fluids in a pipe
Venturi pump, a pump using the venturi effect
Venturi scrubber, gas stream scrubber
Venturi Transport Protocol, transport layer protocol

Companies
Venturi (company), an electric car manufacturer

Motorsport
Venturi Grand Prix, a team competing in the FIA Formula E World Championship
For the team that competed as Venturi in the 1992 Formula One season, see Larrousse
See also: Venturini Motorsports, an American stock car team

Places
Venturi, the Provençal Occitan name for Montagne Sainte-Victoire

People 

 Robert Venturi